The Málaga Open is a professional tennis tournament played on hard courts. It is currently part of the Association of Tennis Professionals (ATP) Challenger Tour. It is held in Málaga, Spain, with the first edition played in 2022.

Past finals

Singles

Doubles

References

ATP Challenger Tour
Hard court tennis tournaments
Tennis tournaments in Spain